Sketches from the Book of the Dead is the fifth studio album by Australian singer-songwriter Mick Harvey, and his first album of all original material. It was released in 2011 by Mute Records.
"October Boy" is a homage to his former bandmate, Rowland S. Howard.

Track listing
All songs written by Mick Harvey.

Personnel
Katrina Beale – paintings
Mick Harvey – bass, composer, cover layout, guitar, organ, percussion, piano, producer, vocals
David McCluney – engineer, mixing
Gustav Pillig – cover painting
Wez Prictor – mastering
J.P. Shilo – accordion, guitar, violin
P.A. Taylor – cover layout
Xanthe Waite – backing vocals
Rosie Westbrook – double bass

References

2011 albums
Mute Records albums
Mick Harvey albums